The Obsessed is the debut album by American metal band the Obsessed, released in 1990 by Hellhound Records. All songs were recorded in 1985 for an intended album for Metal Blade Records, which had never been released. The release of this album prompted singer Scott "Wino" Weinrich to leave Saint Vitus and reform the Obsessed with a new rhythm section.

The album was re-released by Tolotta Records in 2000 with new artwork and 10 live bonus tracks recorded at Glenmont Rec. Center in Wheaton, Maryland, on February 25, 1984.

It was re-released again on November 17, 2017 by Relapse Records with a slightly updated version of the original artwork. The CD version came with a bonus disc that included the 1984 demo Concrete Cancer,  as well as a concert recorded "Live at the Bayou" in Washington, D.C. on April 15, 1985.

Track listing
All songs written by Scott Weinrich, except where noted.

"Tombstone Highway" – 3:29
"The Way She Fly" – 2:22
"Forever Midnight" – 4:59
"Ground Out" – 3:17
"Fear Child" – 1:53
"Freedom" – 5:58
"Red Disaster" (Weinrich, Mark Laue) – 3:52
"Inner Turmoil" – 2:21
"River of Soul" – 4:26

2000 reissue live bonus tracks:
 "No Message" – 1:03
 "Neatz Brigade" – 4:54
 "Concrete Cancer" – 3:13
 "Mental Kingdom" – 2:49
 "Feelingz" – 2:26
 "A World Apart" – 1:45
 "Freedom" – 5:04
 "Blind Lightning" – 3:45
 "Indestroy" – 1:47
 "Kill Ugly Naked" – 2:07

2017 reissue bonus disc:
 Concrete Cancer (Demo) – 3:02
 Feelingz (Demo) – 2:11 
 Mental Kingdom (Demo) – 2:50 
 Hiding Masque (Demo) – 3:31
 Ground Out/Feelingz (Live) – 5:07
 Concrete Cancer (Live) – 3:10
 No Blame (Live) – 2:43 
 Mental Kingdom (Live) – 2:59
 Tombstone Highway (Live) – 3:13
 Iron and Stone (Live) – 3:27
 River of Soul (Live) – 3:58
 Sittin' on a Grave/I Don't Care (Live) – 4:47
 Freedom (Live) – 5:52
 Indestroy/Kill Ugly Naked (Live) – 3:29

Personnel
Scott "Wino" Weinrich – vocals and guitar, producer
Mark Laue – bass
Ed Gulli – drums

Production
Ray Tilkens – engineer
Mathias Schneeberger, Stephan Gross – mixing at Vielkang Studio, Berlin

References

1990 albums
The Obsessed albums
Hellhound Records albums
Tolotta Records albums